Some Days Are Diamonds may refer to:
 Some Days Are Diamonds (album), a 1981 album by John Denver
 "Some Days Are Diamonds (Some Days Are Stone)", a 1976 song written by Dick Feller